John Wheeler House is a historic home located in the Murfreesboro Historic District at Murfreesboro, Hertford County, North Carolina.  It was built about 1805, and is a two-story, three bay, vernacular Federal style brick dwelling with a central passage plan.  The front facade features a later two-story pedimented portico.  It was the birthplace of John H. Wheeler (1806-1882) and later home of Congressman Jesse Johnson Yeates (1829-1892).

It was listed on the National Register of Historic Places in 1971.

Gallery

References

Historic American Buildings Survey in North Carolina
Houses on the National Register of Historic Places in North Carolina
Federal architecture in North Carolina
Houses completed in 1805
Houses in Hertford County, North Carolina
National Register of Historic Places in Hertford County, North Carolina
1805 establishments in North Carolina
Historic district contributing properties in North Carolina
Buildings and structures in Murfreesboro, North Carolina